The Marian Street Theatre is located in the Sydney suburb of Killara. The theatre previously played a significant role in the cultural life of the North Shore and is widely remembered by former patrons and theatre lovers across Sydney.

Built in 1906 as a Soldiers Memorial Hall, it was used as a community hall up until 1966. Hosting dances, parties, lectures, drama performances, Polio vaccines and school breakups. In 1948, the actress Vivien Leigh opened a flower show at Marian Street. The building was transformed into a community theatre in 1966 by the English born actor, Alexander Archdale.

Seating was increased from 311 to 400 in 1980. In the early 1980s, theatre programs credited the "theatre cat" known as "spunky". Often beset by financial difficulties, the theatre has now evolved into the Marian Street Children's Theatre and Drama School (MSTYP - Marian Street Theatre for Young People). For safety reasons, the theatre temporarily closed in 2013 and work is scheduled to begin in mid-2021 on the renovations. Marian Street Theatre for Young People continues to operate externally from the Marian Street Theatre building, while the site is closed.

Artistic directors included Peter Collingwood, Aarne Neeme, John Krummel, Noel Ferrier  and Alastair Duncan. Prominent actors who performed at Marian Street include Leonard Teale, Stuart Wagstaff, Ruth Cracknell, Helen Morse, Ron Haddrick and Nancye Hayes.

External link

References

Theatres in Sydney
Theatre in Sydney